Stadtmitte (meaning: city centre) is an urban quarter in the central Borough 1 of Düsseldorf, Germany. Stadtmitte borders with Carlstadt, Pempelfort, Oberbilk and the old town of Düsseldorf: Düsseldorf-Altstadt.

In the Stadtmitte there are:
 Düsseldorf Hauptbahnhof, the Main Station for Düsseldorf 
 the Schadowstraße - one of the highest turnover shopping streets in Europe
 the greatest theatre of Düsseldorf (Schauspielhaus)
 the stock exchange of Düsseldorf
 WestLB, the central bank of North Rhine-Westphalia (Landeszentralbank)
 Thyssen-Haus (Dreischeibenhaus)
 the Königsallee, short Kö, a prominent shopping street.

Economy

All Nippon Airways has its Düsseldorf Sales Office in Stadtmitte.

References

External links 

 Stadtmitte, City of Düsseldorf 

Urban districts and boroughs of Düsseldorf